David A. Glascock (July 30, 1885 – February 16, 1969) was an American basketball coach. He was the head basketball coach at Indiana State University from 1924 to 1927 and again for 1932–33 season, compiling a record of 33–32.

A United States Army veteran of World War I, he was a First Lt in Battery "E" of the 323rd Field Artillery; he was decorated for his actions at Verdun. He held an AM (1915) from Indiana University and a PhD from Columbia University.

Coaching career
Prior to becoming a collegiate coach, Glascock spent 13 years as a high school coach. His first job came as head coach at his alma mater, Crawfordsville High School in Crawfordsville, Indiana. In his first year, the Athenians went 13–1 and claimed the mythical state championship over rival, Lebanon Senior High School due to a higher winning percentage; though Lebanon had more wins. In 1911, Crawfordsville won 16 games and lost 2 (.889) and the first Indiana High School Boys Basketball Tournament.  During his this two-year stint, he went 29–3 (.906)  He then moved to coaching jobs in Illinois, South Dakota and Utah.

Glascock returned to the Indiana as the Head Coach of the Indiana State Sycamores men's basketball varsity team from 1924 to 1927 and again in 1932–33.  He was named a full professor in the physical education department in 1947; he was named Chairman of the Department in 1948 and retired in 1952.  He held positions as the Track & Field and Cross-Country coach, as well as the Freshman Basketball Coach, in addition to teaching courses on Physical Education during his tenure.  Prior to his return to Indiana, he served as the athletic director at Northern State University in Aberdeen, South Dakota in 1915.

Honors
 1966 Indiana Basketball Hall of Fame
 1982 Indiana State University Hall of Fame
 Wabash College Hall of Fame
 2003 Montgomery County Basketball Hall of Fame

Head coaching record

High school
{| class="wikitable"
|-
! Years
! School
! Wins
! Losses
! Pct.
! Highlight
|-
| 1909–10
| Crawfordsville Athenians
| 13
| 1
| .929
| style="font-weight:bold" | Mythical State Champion
|-
| 1910–11
| Crawfordsville Athenians
| 16
| 2
| .889
| style="font-weight:bold" | IHSAA State Championship
|-

College

References

1880s births
1955 deaths
American men's basketball coaches
American men's basketball players
United States Army personnel of World War I
Basketball coaches from Indiana
High school basketball coaches in Indiana
Basketball players from Indiana
Columbia University alumni
High school basketball coaches in the United States
Indiana State Sycamores men's basketball coaches
Northern State Wolves athletic directors
People from Crawfordsville, Indiana
Wabash Little Giants basketball players